Scopula dimorphata is a moth of the family Geometridae. It is found in Asia, including China, Sulawesi and Bali.

Subspecies
Scopula dimorphata dimorphata (Sulawesi)
Scopula dimorphata hainanica Prout, 1938 (Hainan)
Scopula dimorphata suffidaria (Swinhoe, 1902) (Bali)

References

Moths described in 1881
dimorphata
Moths of Asia
Taxa named by Samuel Constantinus Snellen van Vollenhoven